Htun Kyi, pen name Minn Latt Yekhaun (Rangoon, 19 July 1925-Shan State, c.1985) was a Burmese linguist who studied and published in Czechoslovakia. He returned to Burma to fight as a member of the Burmese Communist Party but was later shot by his own comrades.

Works

References

1925 births
1985 deaths
Linguists from Myanmar
Burmese studies scholars
Burmese communists
People from Yangon
20th-century linguists
Charles University alumni